Eustice may refer to:
Ernest Eustice (1904–1958), South African boxer
George Eustice (born 1971), British Conservative politician, elected MP for Camborne and Redruth in 2010
Ken Eustice, a former Australian rules football player 1958–1970, also a club president and coach

See also
Eustace